The 1977 Individual Long Track World Championship was the seventh edition of the FIM speedway Individual Long Track World Championship. The event was held on 11 September 1977 in Aalborg, Denmark.

The world title was won by Anders Michanek of Sweden.

Final Classification 

Key
 E = eliminated (no further ride)
 f = fell
 ef = engine failure

References 

1977
Speedway competitions in Denmark
Motor
Motor